Alice Elizabeth Chapman (October 29, 1967 – June 26, 2019) was an American bounty hunter and reality star who co-starred with her husband, Duane "Dog" Chapman, on the reality television shows Dog the Bounty Hunter, Dog and Beth: On the Hunt, and  Dog's Most Wanted.

Personal life 
Chapman was born in Denver, Colorado, one of five children born to Garry L. Smith, a Brach's Candies salesman. She trained as both a gymnast and ice skater. For some time she was a nightclub stripper, waitress and clerk. Chapman spent the majority of her early life in Colorado before moving to Honolulu to be with her future husband Duane Chapman, whom she married in 2006. In a mothers day address delivered at a church in an episode of Dogs Most Wanted, she claimed to have been raised as a Mennonite. Chapman was a Christian.

Career 
Chapman starred in reality television shows alongside her husband Duane Chapman, most notably Dog the Bounty Hunter which originally was released in late 2004 and lasted 8 seasons until 2012. Chapman's final series was Dog's Most Wanted which was being filmed in 2019. She died while the show was being produced. Dog's Most Wanted features Beth getting the news of her terminal cancer and her fight with it over time before her death. The final episode is dedicated to her memory.

Illness and death 
Beth Chapman was diagnosed with stage two throat cancer in September 2017, and initially went into remission. However, the disease later spread to her lungs. In early 2019, Chapman began filming their new show, Dog's Most Wanted, and on June 22, during production, she was hospitalized and placed in a medically induced coma at The Queen's Medical Center in Honolulu, where she later died from complications from the illness on June 26. According to her death certificate, her ashes were scattered at sea. In the final episode of Dog's Most Wanted, this event was shown along with footage from her memorial services in Hawaii and Colorado.

References

External links
 

1967 births
2019 deaths
People from Denver
People from Honolulu
Bounty hunters
Participants in American reality television series
Deaths from throat cancer
Deaths from lung cancer
Deaths from cancer in Hawaii